Mark Dacey (born June 22, 1966) is a Canadian curler originally from Saskatchewan. He was based at the Mayflower Curling Club in Halifax, Nova Scotia.

Dacey is a former Canadian men's curling champion skip, having won the 2004 Nokia Brier. He defeated Randy Ferbey's team, ending their 3-year Brier winning streak. Dacey went on to win a bronze medal at the 2004 Ford World Curling Championship.

Competitive history
Mark Dacey was a runner-up in the 1995 Brier, as the vice-skip for team Saskatchewan (skipped by Brad Heidt). Representing Nova Scotia, he reached the 2001 Nokia Brier, finishing with a 6-5 record, and at the 2003 Nokia Brier in Halifax, he finished third during the round-robin, with a 7-4 record. They lost the final to Randy Ferbey.

Dacey also won the 2002 Canadian Mixed Curling Championship. In 2005, Dacey was unable to win the Nova Scotia men's championship, precluding him from defending his National title at the 2005 Tim Hortons Brier. In 2006, Dacey recaptured the provincial championship to return to the Brier. His team finished 7-4 in the round-robin, and defeated Alberta's Kevin Martin in the first playoff game. They lost to eventual champion Jean-Michel Ménard of Quebec in the semifinal, securing a third-place finish.

The Dacey team announced it was taking a year off as of Tuesday April 9, 2007.

However, in the 2008 Nova Scotia provincials, the team was back minus Dacey. Bruce Lohnes (Third), Rob Harris (Second), Andrew Gibson (Lead), curled in the provincial finals with Colleen Jones' husband Scott Saunders skipping them.

Dacey won his second mixed title in November 2009 at the 2010 Canadian Mixed Curling Championship. This qualified him and his wife, Heather to represent Canada at the 2010 World Mixed Doubles Curling Championship. However, they had to pull out after being delayed by the air travel disruption after the 2010 Eyjafjallajökull eruption.

Teams

Grand Slam record

Personal life
He was the husband of 2004 Nova Scotia women's curling champion Heather Smith; they separated in 2013.

References

External links
 

1966 births
Living people
Canadian male curlers
Brier champions
Canadian mixed curling champions
Curlers from Nova Scotia
Sportspeople from Halifax, Nova Scotia
Curlers from Saskatoon
Continental Cup of Curling participants
Canada Cup (curling) participants
20th-century Canadian people